was a district located in Ishikawa Prefecture, Japan.

As of 2003, the district had an estimated population of 9,801 and a density of 63.48 persons per km2. The total area was 154.39 km2.

Towns and villages
Prior to its dissolution, the district had one town:

 Yamanaka

History

Recent mergers
 On October 1, 2005 - The town of Yamanaka was merged into the expanded city of Kaga. Therefore, Enuma District was dissolved as a result of this merger.

See also
 List of dissolved districts of Japan

Former districts of Ishikawa Prefecture